The following is a list of notable events and releases of the year 1946 in Norwegian music.

Events

September
 1 – Kringkastingsorkestret, KORK, (Norwegian Radio Orchestra) was founded.

Unknown date
 The jazz club Kristiansands Rytmeklubb was established in Kristiansand.

Deaths

 April
 30 – Olav Gunnarsson Helland, Hardanger fiddle maker (born 1875).

Births

 January
 31 – Knut Lystad, actor, singer, translator, screenwriter, comedian, and director.

 February
 9 – Georg Kajanus, composer and pop guitarist, singer and songwriter (Sailor).
 17 – Helge Jordal, actor and singer.
 25 – Jan Groth, singer, Aunt Mary, Just 4 Fun, cancer (died 2014).

 March
 16 – Sigmund Groven, classical harmonica player.

 April
 14 – Knut Kristiansen, jazz pianist, composer and orchestra leader.
 16 – Ivar Antonsen, jazz pianist and composer.
 24 – Thor Hilmersen, rock guitarist (died 2014).

 May
 9 – Harald Sæther, composer.
 16 – Olav Anton Thommessen, contemporary composer.

 June
 10 – Arild Engh, drummer, Ole Ivars (died 2017).

 August
 14 – Bjørn Kruse, saxophonist, composer, and painter.

 September
 12 – Ole A. Sørli, musician, writer, and record producer (died 2009).

 October
 18 – Sverre Kjelsberg, singer and bassist (died 2016).

 November
 23 – Agnes Buen Garnås, traditional folk singer.

 December 
 7 – Kirsti Sparboe, singer and actress.

See also
 1946 in Norway
 Music of Norway

References

 
Norwegian music
Norwegian
Music
1940s in Norwegian music